God's Thunder or Le Tonnerre de Dieu is a 1965 French, Italian and West German-produced comedy film, directed by Denys de La Patellière. The film is set in Nantes but many scenes were filmed in studios.

Cast
Jean Gabin	... 	Léandre Brassac
Michèle Mercier	... 	Simone Leboucher
Robert Hossein	... 	Marcel
Lilli Palmer	... 	Marie Brassac
Georges Géret	... 	Roger
Emma Danieli	... 	La dame au teckel (as Emma Danielli)
Ellen Schwiers	... 	Françoise
Nino Vingelli	... 	Le patron du café
Daniel Ceccaldi	... 	Le prêtre
Louis Arbessier	... 	Bricard, le ministre
Léa Gray	... 	La taulière
Danielle Durou	... 	Une fille
Lydie Balmer	... 	Une fille
Nicole Beurggrave	... 	Une fille
Mireille Galot	... 	Une fille
Paul Pavel	... 	L'ami de Marcel

Reception
It was the seventh most popular film of 1965 in France, after The Sucker, Goldfinger, Thunderball, Gendarme in New York, Mary Poppins and Fantomas Unleashed.

External links

References

1965 films
West German films
1960s French-language films
1965 comedy-drama films
French comedy-drama films
Italian comedy-drama films
Films directed by Denys de La Patellière
Films set in France
1960s Italian films
1960s French films
French-language German films
French-language Italian films